"Karma (What Goes Around)" is a song made by Australian hip-hop recording group 1200 Techniques. The song was released in April 2002 as the lead and only single from the group's debut studio album, Choose One. The song peaked at number 36 on the ARIA Charts.

At the ARIA Music Awards of 2002, the song won the ARIA Award for Best Independent Release and Michael Gracey and Babyfoot Productions won the Best Video.

Track listing

Charts

References

2002 singles
2002 songs
ARIA Award-winning songs